Leonid Ogul (born 26 October 1963, Torbeyevo) is a Russian political figure and a deputy of the 6th, 7th, and 8th State Dumas. In 2008, Ogul was granted a Candidate of Sciences in Medicine degree. 

From 1988 to 2004, Ogul worked as the resuscitator-anaesthesiologist of the pediatric resuscitation department. In 2005-2012, he headed the chief physician of the municipal health institution. On December 3, 2000, he was elected deputy of the Astrakhan City Council. From 2001 to 2011, Ogul served as deputy of the Duma of Astrakhan Oblast. In 2011, 2016, 2021, Ogul was elected as a deputy of the 6th, 7th, and 8th State Dumas.

References

1989 births
Living people
United Russia politicians
21st-century Russian politicians
Eighth convocation members of the State Duma (Russian Federation)